Kureepuzha Sreekumar (born 10 April 1955 in Kureepuzha, Kollam, Kerala) is a noted Malayalam poet with modernist inclinations. His books of poetry include Habibinte Dinakkurippukal, his first, published in 1984, Sreekumarinte Dukkangal, Rahulan Urangunnilla, Amma Malayalam, Keezhaalan and Suicide Point. He is an atheist.

Career as Writer
He won the Best Poet Award in 1975 from Kerala University, the 1987 Vyloppilli Award for Malayalam poetry, and the Kerala Sahithya Akademi Sree Padmanabhaswamy Award for 2003 for the best work in children's literature for his work Penangunni. He refused to accept the Sree Padmanabhaswamy Award as it was named after a Hindu God. In 2011 he won the Kerala Sahitya Akademi Award (Poetry) for his work Keezhalan. Nastik nation, an atheist and free-thought organisation, has created a meme from one of his poems which has the title, "What's A Bad Habit" File:Poet_Kureepuzha_Sreekumar.jpg| Poem by Kureepuzha Sreekumar

Literary Works 
 Amma Malayalam  (അമ്മ മലയാളം)
 Uppa  (ഉപ്പ)
 Pengalsthan
 Habibinte Dinakkurippukal
 Sreekumarinte Dukkangal
 Rahulan Urangunnilla
 Chaarvakan  (ചാർവാകൻ)
 Suicide Point
 Keezhalan  (കീഴാളൻ)
 ഇഷ്ടമുടിക്കായൽ
 ജെസി
 നടിയുടെ രാത്രി
 രാഹുലൻ ഉറങ്ങുന്നില്ല

References

1955 births
Living people
Writers from Kollam
Poets from Kerala
Malayalam-language writers
Malayalam poets
Recipients of the Kerala Sahitya Akademi Award
Indian male poets
20th-century Indian poets
20th-century Indian male writers
Recipients of the Abu Dhabi Sakthi Award